Achva Academic College is a public academic institution located within the jurisdiction of Beer Tuvia Regional Council.

The college offers academic studies in science, education, social sciences, and the humanities.  It is accredited to grant undergraduate and graduate degrees and teaching diplomas.

As of the 2021 academic year, the college had approximately 3,000 students and 500 lecturers in some twenty fields of knowledge, including special education, preschool education, mathematics teaching, English teaching, life sciences, psychology, information systems, communications disorders, applied computer sciences, and more. In addition to academic studies, Achva Academic College also offers diploma studies and continuing education courses and programs for completing high school enrollment and specific preparatory programs.

The Achva campus mainly serves the adjacent peripheral areas and encourages a multi-cultural approach that welcomes diverse population groups who wish to acquire higher education. The college is accessible to students with a range of special needs.

Several centers operate within the College 
The Innovation & Entrepreneurship Unit – trains students to be creative educators, entrepreneurs, and leaders who can respond to today's challenges.

The Neuropedagogy Center – combines in-depth study of papers on brain research with their application in learning and teaching.

The Simulation Center – trains students to work effectively in education using learning processes based on practical experience as an integral part of studying education.

History 
Achva Academic College was established in 1971 by Beer Tuvia Regional Council as a training college for teachers and early childhood teachers to obtain senior teaching qualifications.

In the early 1970s, the college offered programs for technicians and mechanical engineers in construction plus industry & management and non-academic teaching programs, including a two-year course for kindergarten teacher qualification and a one-year course for kindergarten aides. By the end of the 1970s, the college offered supplementary education courses for mothers. Soon afterward, it became an independent association offering non-academic studies towards a qualified senior teacher's diploma.

In 1993, Achva College was approved by the Council of Higher Education (CHE) to offer study programs under the academic supervision of Ben Gurion University of the Negev. Furthermore, in 1995 the college received a permit from the CHE, allowing it to award B.Ed. Degrees for its training courses for early childhood, elementary, and middle school teachers, in its education departments, literature, history, mathematics, sciences, Jewish studies, Hebrew language, and special education.

In 1998, Achva received accreditation for its B.Ed. Degree courses and recognition of its Arabic, English, and Computer departments.

In 1997, under the guidance of the CHE, the college introduced an administrative separation between the Academic College of Education and the college under the auspices of Ben-Gurion University.

The Achva Independent Association began activities in September 2000 under the academic supervision of Ben-Gurion University, and over the years, offered 12 general studies programs leading to undergraduate degrees.

The college also provided transitional programs during this period enabling outstanding students to transfer to Ben-Gurion University.

In 2009 the college, which had operated under Ben-Gurion University's auspices, was recognized as an independent academic institution, awarding its independent B.Sc. degrees in life sciences.   The college separated from the university in 2012. The combined structure created one unique college with two undergraduate schools – one specializing in education and sciences, plus a school for graduate degrees. In 2012, after a lengthy process of work by professional steering committees, a strategy was drawn up of uniting the colleges that had previously operated under Achva Academic Campus.  That year the CHE approved the unification of the colleges under the single name of Achva Academic College.

As of the 5781 academic years, the college had approximately 3,000 students and 500 lecturers of various grades (senior faculty and junior faculty) in some twenty fields of knowledge, including special education, early childhood education, mathematics teaching, English teaching, life sciences, psychology, information systems, communication disorders, practical computer sciences, and more.

Tuition Fees and Scholarships 
Tuition fees at the college are the same as university fees.  The college offers a range of assistance and encouragement scholarships equivalent to full first-year tuition fees for students who meet the acceptance conditions and full-tuition scholarships for students with high acceptance grades. Under the ‘Student Communities’ project, students who move to Kiryat Malachi and Rahat receive a grant for tuition fees and living expenses in return for social activity within the towns.

External links
Achva Academic College

Universities and colleges in Israel
Educational institutions established in 1971
1971 establishments in Israel